This is a list of all supertall skyscrapers height of 300 to 599m.

Supertall skyscrapers

Supertall skyscrapers under construction or proposed

See also 

List of architects of supertall buildings
List of megatall skyscrapers
List of tallest buildings in the world
Supertall skyscraper

References 

Lists of buildings and structures
Lists of tallest buildings
Lists of construction records